St. John's Central College (Irish: Lár Choláiste Eoin) is a further education college in Cork City, Ireland. The college is administered by the Cork Education and Training Board.

History of St. John's Central College

19th Century

The earliest part of the college is St. John's Episcopalian church, which was built in 1840. The church was used by the local community, which included young women from the Governesses Seminary in Warren Place.

A second building on Sawmill Street, Buckingham House, was built in the mid 19th Century, and was used as a female refuge and penitentiary until its closure in 1901. The building was then occupied by the Buckingham House Free School, an orphanage that had operated since 1875.

1950s to 1960s

St. John's Episcopalian church was sold to the City of Cork VEC on 11 June 1963 for IR£19,885. Buckingham House ran until 1958 when it was sold to the City of Cork VEC for IR£13,100.

In 1961, The School of Building and Junior Technical Institute commenced its classes. The college was aimed at vocational training, and included a School of Furniture, built in 1963.

1980s to 1990s

The college saw declining pupil numbers during the 1980s, and moved to teach Post Leaving Certificate courses.

2000s

In 2003 the college had over 1000 students enrolled in its courses. To keep up with this demand, the original wall of the female refuge and penitentiary on Sawmill Street were demolished, as well as classrooms constructed during the mid 1960s. In their place was constructed a new four story, 5200 square metre teaching facility.

Courses
St. John's Central College offers both academic, vocational, apprenticeship and pre apprenticeship courses. 
Full time courses include Applied Sciences, Art & Design, Construction & Engineering, Information Technology, Media Technology, Software Engineering and Services.
 all of which have routes into Higher education. Vocational courses on offer include motor maintenance, Environmental science  and hairdressing.

Full Time Day Courses

Applied Sciences 
Veterinary Nursing L5

Canine Husbandry L5

Companion & Captive Animal Studies L5

Veterinary Nursing L6

Animal Science and Management L6

Science & Laboratory Techniques L5

Science with Environmental Studies L5

Art & Design 
Art, Craft & Design L5

Fine Art – Painting and Sculpture L6

Cartoon Animation L5

Cartoon Animation L6

Creative Technology & Art L5

Fashion Design L5

Fashion Design L6

Fashion Design & Media L5

Graphic Design & Illustration L5

Illustration L6

Interior Architecture & Design L5

Interior Architecture & Design L6

Interior Architecture & Design HNC L6

Interior Architecture & Design HND L6

Jewellery Making & Art Metalcraft L5

Jewellery Making & Art Metalcraft L6

Construction & Engineering 
Architectural 3D Modelling BIM REVIT L5

Furniture Making & Restoration Skills L5

Engineering Technology L5

Motor Maintenance & Light Engineering L5

Motorcycle & Small Engine Maintenance L5

Musical Instrument Making & Repair L5

Musical Instrument Making & Repair L6

Information Technology 

Applied Computer Training Course L5

Computers & Business Applications L5

Computers & Business Applications L6

Computer Game Design & Development L5

Computer Game Design & Development L6

Cloud Computing with Coding L5

Cloud Computing with Coding L6

Networks & Cyber Security L5

Networks & Cyber Security L6

New Directions IT Skills Development L4 – Part time

Software Development L5

Media Technology 
Film, TV and Video Production L5

Advanced Film, TV & Video Production L6

Creative Digital Media L5

Creative Digital Media L6

Photographic Studies L5

Photographic Studies L6

Soundtracks & Sound Design L5

Services 
Tourism, Travel with Business L5

Tourism, Travel with Business L6

Hairdressing & Barbering L5

Barbering & Salon Management L6

Pharmacy Assistant L5

Facilities
The college includes many modern teaching facilities, including a laboratory, dark room, art studios, hair dressing studio and tool workshops.

Information Resource Centre (IRC)

The Information Resource Centre at St. Johns contains many books designed to help students with their courses. The IRC also includes computers where students can research on the internet, or access the library's online catalogue. Students can also download their course and lesson notes, in a pilot scheme designed to help students access their college work online.

References

See also
 Education in the Republic of Ireland
 List of further education colleges in the Republic of Ireland
 Education in Cork

Education in Cork (city)
Further education colleges in County Cork
Buildings and structures in Cork (city)